The 2017–18 Honduran Liga Nacional season was the 43rd Honduran Liga Nacional edition since its establishment in 1965.  For this season, the system format remained the same as the previous season.  The tournament ran from 19 July 2008 to 24 May 2009.  The season was divided into two halves (Apertura and Clausura), each crowning one champion.  C.D. Marathón and Club Deportivo Olimpia won one tournament each and qualified to the 2009–10 CONCACAF Champions League.  Additionally, Real C.D. España also qualified with the best non-champion record as Belizean teams failed the CONCACAF stadium requirements.

2008–09 teams

A total of 10 teams competed in the tournament, including 9 sides from the 2007–08 season plus C.D. Real Juventud, promoted from the 2007–08 Liga de Ascenso.

 Deportes Savio also used Estadio Roberto Martínez Ávila due to field renovations.
 C.D. Motagua also used Estadio Marcelo Tinoco due to field renovations.
 C.D. Olimpia also used Estadio Carlos Miranda due to field renovations.
 C.D. Platense also used Estadio Olímpico Metropolitano due to a dispute between the club and the city of Puerto Cortés.

Apertura

Scouting reports
In the 2007–08 season, C.D. Platense suffered great adversity avoiding relegation in their last match.  Their manager Nahúm Espinoza is the mastermind for which the 'dogfish' have changed their form of play and have transformed into a dangerous team aiming for great things.  A key benchmarks for Platense is midfielder Carlos Mejía, with his talent will try to carry the team on a good path and hopefully a fight for the title.  Platense has not fallen behind in signing new players for this tournament.  New arrivals include Edilson Pereira, who played previously with Deportes Savio, Willian Veloso, who has shown in preseason matches to be a prominent goalscorer, and Evandro Ferreira, with his speed will try to unbalance the opposing defenses.  To add to this is the experience of Walter López, who will be in charge of creating plays and give dynamism to the goalkeepers.

Despite C.D. Victoria's manager Javier Padilla insisting the main objective is save their position, the fans think the opposite because they know they have a good lineup to aspire for more.  The fans think of nothing more than to lift another trophy, considering that Victoria maintains the fundamental parts of the team from the previous tournaments.  They have reinforced the squad with talented and nationally experienced players like José Pineda, Juan Cárcamo, and Carlos Discua.  They also signed the Uruguayans Richard Pérez and Mauricio Webber and have promoted from their reserves forwards Erick Ayala and Víctor Maldonado.  With their current squad, Victoria can reach at the least the playoff round to satisfy their fans, who expected something more dignified in the previous tournament but finished in sixth place despite the strong investment from their patroness.  The team had a good preseason and aims to bring honor to their name.

Recently promoted C.D. Real Juventud have prepared for one goal: to maintain the position in the league.  Since their establishment on 30 May 30 1965, the team never had the opportunity to be able to ascend and play in the Liga Nacional but they now find the opportunity to assemble their own history.  Their manager Emilio Umanzor have stated in addition to staying in the league, the team will try to classify as one of the best four in the league and not playing a relegation battle like the majority of the sporting people and press have insisted.  Real Juventud arrives with great expectations for the Apertura tournament.  Real Juventud will fall upon the success of their Liga de Ascenso campaign and aim for decent position.

A team with the squad and budget of Deportes Savio obviously won't compete for the title.  This does not stop them from causing harm to other clubs with greater aspirations.  They will be playing their home matches on an unfamiliar field: Estadio Roberto Martínez Ávila in Siguatepeque, since their stadium is being remodeled.  A key loss for the team is the Brazilian Edilson Pereira who signed with Platense.  On the other hand, important arrivals include goalie Hugo Caballero, the midfielders Marco Mejía and Elmer Marín, and forward Édgar Núñez.  Deportes Savio will seek to grab points early on to avoid suffering like the previous tournament and with that seek, maybe not the playoff rounds, but their permanency in the league.

C.D.S. Vida will participate in the tournament with a modest team filled with prospects that intend to shine in the league.  The directive administration will wage at their inferior categories that they intend to remain in the league.  The challenges their manager Alberto Romero faces are difficult because he must erase the frustration from the fans and support the team's president character, who at the moment of saying things says it first and then thinks.  The team president and manager have clashed before with Romero threatening to quit the team due to some unilateral decision but soon was resolved.  Vida had a good preseason with many matches in the United States and Guatemala.

Regular season

Standings

Results
 As of 22 November 2008

Round 1

Round 2

Round 3

Round 4

Round 5

Round 6

Round 7

Round 8

Round 9

Round 10

Round 11

Round 12

Round 13

Round 14

Round 15

Round 16

Round 17

Round 18

 On 12 August, Real España obtained 2 additional points and Deportes Savio had 1 deducted for fielding an ineligible player in round 1; the goal records of both clubs remain unchanged.

Postseason

Semifinals

 Real España 4–4 Olimpia on aggregated.  Real España advanced on regular season record.

 Marathón 1–1 Motagua on aggregated.  Marathón advanced on regular season record.

Final

 Marathón won 2–1 on aggregate.

Top goalscorers
 As of 13 December 2008
13 goals
  Everaldo Ferreira (Real España)
9 goals
  Marcelo Cabrita (Platense)
8 goals

  Leonardo Isaula (Hispano)
  Allan Lalín (Real España)

7 goals

  Mauricio Copete (Victoria)
  Ney Costa (Deportes Savio)
  Milton Ruiz (Hispano)

6 goals

  Oscar Torlacoff (Motagua)
  Ramiro Bruschi (Olimpia)
  Carlos Pavón (Real España)

5 goals

  Saúl Martínez (Marathón)
  Nicolás Cardozo (Vida)
  Jocimar Nascimento (Motagua)
  Rigoberto Padilla (Hispano)
  Nery Medina (Real España)
  Wilmer Velásquez (Olimpia)
  Carlos Will Mejía (Marathón)

4 goals

  Marvin Chávez (Marathón)
  Jorge Lozano (Deportes Savio)

3 goals

  Mario Rodríguez (Real España)
  Marcelo Cabecao (Hispano)
  Mauricio Sabillón (Marathón)
  Juan Manuel Cárcamo (Victoria)
  Georgie Welcome (Motagua)
  Evandro Ferreira (Platense)
  Danilo Turcios (Olimpia)
  Carlos Paez (Real Juventud)

2 goals

  Oscar Vargas (Vida)
  Mario Euceda (Deportes Savio)
  Carlos Discua (Victoria)
  Harrison Róchez (Deportes Savio)
  Charles Córdova (Real Juventud)
  Carlos Morán (Victoria)
  Mauricio Weber (Victoria)
  Adán Ramírez (Platense)
  Reinaldo Tilguath (Motagua)
  Milton Núñez (Marathón)
  Javier Portillo (Hispano)
  Marcelo Ferreira (Platense)
  David Molina (Motagua)
  Ninrod Medina (Victoria)
  Juliano Rangel (Deportes Savio)
  Carlos Navarro (Real Juventud)
  Mariano Acevedo (Marathón)
  Oscar Zepeda (Deportes Savio)
  David Meléndez (Real Juventud)
  Ramón Núñez (Olimpia)
  Erick Norales (Marathón)

1 goal

  Rubén Rivera (Motagua)
  Willian Veloso (Platense)
  Miguel Castillo (Motagua)
  Orvin Paz (Marathón)
  Lenín Suárez (Deportes Savio)
  Diktmart Hernández (Victoria)
  Bani Lozano (Platense)
  Shannon Welcome (Motagua)
  Carlos Dias (Real España)
  Maynor Gómez (Real Juventud)
  Rubén Matamoros (Hispano)
  Walter Hernández (Olimpia)
  Edilson Pereira (Platense)
  Rony Morales (Olimpia)
  John Pérez (Hispano)
  Johnny Galdámez (Deportes Savio)
  Nilberto da Silva (Motagua)
  Francisco Díaz (Platense)
  Elkin González (Real España)
  Oscar Fortín (Deportes Savio)
  Pablo Genovese (Hispano)
  Gabriel Casas (Vida)
  Juan Carlos García (Marathón)
  Luis López (Marathón)
  Edgar Núñez (Deportes Savio)
  Luis Pérez (Platense)
  Henry Bermúdez (Victoria)
  Francisco Aguilar (Real Juventud)
  Hendry Thomas (Olimpia)
  Román Castillo (Vida)
  Cristian Altamirano (Deportes Savio)
  Ronald del Cid (Real Juventud)
  Allan Kardeck (Olimpia)
  Carlos Salinas (Vida)
  Jerry Palacios (Marathón)
  Angel Rodríguez (Real Juventud)
  Víctor Bernárdez (Motagua)
  Andy Furtado (Marathón)
  Mario Martínez (Real España)
  Fabio de Souza (Olimpia)
  Abner Méndez (Hispano)
  Erick Zepeda (Platense)
  Henry Jiménez (Hispano)
  Richard Pérez (Victoria)
  Francisco Valladares (Motagua)
  Víctor Arzú (Victoria)
  Sergio Diduch (Hispano)
  Oscar Bonieck García (Olimpia)
  Fernando Castillo (Motagua)
  Mario Berríos (Marathón)
  Elroy Smith (Deportes Savio) (o.g.)

Squads

The 2008–09 Clausura was the second part of the 2008–09 season of the Liga Nacional de Fútbol de Honduras, the first division national football league in Honduras. The season started on 10 January 2009 and finished on 24 May 2009. It followed the 2008–09 Apertura season. The winner will compete in the 2009-10 CONCACAF Champions League.

Clausura

Regular season

Standings

On 2 May, Honduras was awarded a 3rd spot in the 2009–10 CONCACAF Champions League due to lack of adequate stadia in Belize. The 3rd spot would go to the short tournament runner-up with the highest overall season points total.  Because of Real C.D. Espana's overall season point total of 68 being highest in the league, they clinch a spot in the 2009–10 CONCACAF Champions League.  Already a runner-up from Apertura 2008, it is guaranteed that the Clausura 2009 runner-up would not have a higher overall season point total than Real Espana.

Results
 As of 2 May 2009

 Platense–Hispano not played due to irrelevance.

Round 1

Round 2

Round 3

Round 4

Round 5

Round 6

Round 7

Round 8

Round 9

Round 10

Round 11

Round 12

Round 13

Round 14

Round 15

Round 16

Round 17

Round 18

Postseason

Semifinals

 Olimpia won 2–1 on aggregate.

 Real España won 6–2 on aggregate.

Final

 Olimpia won 4–3 on aggregate.

Marathon is classified as HON1 for the 2009–10 CONCACAF Champions League, due to their tiebreaker over Olimpia (higher goal differential since both teams had a total of 66 points). Olimpia gets HON2. Real Espana gets HON3, being the only runner-up to short tournaments in the 2008–2009 Honduran National Football League season.

Top goalscorers
 As of 24 May 2009

10 goals
  Sergio Diduch (Hispano)
6 goals

  Bani Lozano (Platense)
  Milton Núñez (Marathón)
  Wilmer Velásquez (Olimpia)
  Douglas Caetano (Real España)
  Ramiro Bruschi (Olimpia)

5 goals

  Ney Costa (Deportes Savio)
  Héctor Flores (Real Juventud)
  Mitchel Brown (Marathón)
  Allan Lalín (Real España)
  Mauricio Copete (Victoria)

4 goals

  Jerry Palacios (Marathón)
  José Güity (Vida)
  Saul Martínez (Marathón)
  Erick Scott (Marathón)
  Carlos Will Mejía (Marathón)
  Osman Chávez (Platense) (2 o.g.)

3 goals

  Luis Ramírez (Marathón)
  Adán Ramírez (Platense)
  Oscar Zepeda (Deportes Savio)
  Marcelo Cabrita (Platense)
  Carlos Morán (Victoria)
  Jorge Lozano (Deportes Savio)
  Edmilson Da Silva (Real España)
  Charles Córdoba (Real Juventud)
  Wilson Güity (Victoria)
  Henry Martínez (Real España)
  Marvin Chávez (Marathón)
  Daniel Cicogna (Olimpia)
  Guillermo Díaz (Motagua) (2 o.g.)
  Milton Palacios Suazo (Marathón) (1 o.g.)

2 goals

  Víctor Arzú (Victoria)
  Rony Paz (Real Juventud)
  Oscar Torlacoff (Motagua)
  Carlos Pavón (Real España)
  Milton Ruiz (Hispano)
  Shannon Welcome (Motagua)
  Harrison Róchez (Deportes Savio)
  Georgie Welcome (Motagua)
  Mario Martínez (Real España)
  Walter Hernández (Olimpia)
  Hendry Thomas (Olimpia)
  Pedro Fernández (Victoria)
  Johnny Calderón (Olimpia)
  Carlos Navarro (Real Juventud)
  Sergio Antúnez (Vida)
  Mario Beata (Marathón)
  Jaime Rosales (Olimpia)
  Roger Rojas (Olimpia)
  Brayan Beckele (Vida)
  Facundo Argüello (Vida)
  Fábio de Souza Loureiro (Olimpia)
  Melvin Valladares (Real España)
  Fabio Ulloa (Real Juventud) (1 o.g.)

1 goal

  Quiarol Arzú (Platense)
  Carlos Dias (Real España)
  Eliu Membreño (Hispano)
  Abner Méndez (Hispano)
  Walter Williams (Vida)
  Luis Santamaría (Vida)
  Juan Manuel Cárcamo (Victoria)
  Oscar Vargas (Vida)
  Marcelo Segales (Victoria)
  Carlos Solórzano (Vida)
  Franco Sosa (Marathón)
  Julio Ocampo (Real Juventud)
  Víctor Ortiz (Victoria)
  Ninrod Medina (Victoria)
  Mario Berríos (Marathón)
  Misael Ruiz (Platense)
  Carlos Cruz (Motagua)
  Eder Delgado (Real España)
  Efraín Flores (Platense)
  Ian Osorio (Platense)
  Gabriel Hernández (Platense)
  Emil Martínez (Marathón)
  David Molina (Motagua)
  Ramón Castillo (Real España)
  Diktmar Hernández (Victoria)
  Mario Gómez (Victoria)
  Leonardo Isaula (Motagua)
  Mario Chávez (Vida)
  Anael Figueroa (Deportes Savio)
  Edgar Ferreira (Vida)
  Mariano Acevedo (Marathón)
  Máximo Arzú (Hispano)
  Irvin Guerrero (Platense)
  Erick Norales (Marathón)
  Jerry Bengtson (Vida)
  Henry Jiménez (Hispano)
  José Luis Palacios (Hispano)
  Christian Altamirano (Deportes Savio)
  Mauricio Weber (Victoria)
  Mauricio Sabillón (Marathón)
  Daniel Lloyd (Motagua)
  Rubén Rivera (Motagua)
  Elroy Smith (Deportes Savio)
  Emilio Izaguirre (Motagua)
  Carlos Salinas (Vida)
  Carlos Discua (Victoria)
  Elkin González (Real España)
  Carlos Palacios (Real España)
  Danilo Turcios (Olimpia)
  Erick Vallecillo (Real España)
  Juan Carlos García (Marathón) (o.g.)
  Johnny Salgado (Hispano) (o.g.)

Aggregate table

References

External links
 ESPN Soccernet
 RSSSF

Liga Nacional de Fútbol Profesional de Honduras seasons
1
Honduras